Haydn Symphonies is an album recorded by the Oregon Symphony under the direction of Carlos Kalmar, released by Pentatone on April 7, 2017. The albums was recorded at Portland, Oregon's Arlene Schnitzer Concert Hall in 2013, and features three symphonies by Joseph Haydn: Symphony No. 53 in D Major ("The Imperial"), Symphony No. 64 in A Major ("Tempora Mutantur"), and Symphony No. 96 in D Major ("The Miracle").

Track listing

 Symphony No. 53 in D Major (The Imperial)
 I. Largo maestoso; Vivace
 II. Andante
 III. Menuetto
 IV. Finale: Capriccio, Moderato

 Symphony No. 64 in A Major (Tempora Mutantur)
 I. Allegro con spirito
 II. Largo
 III. Menuetto: Allegretto
 IV. Finale: Presto

 Symphony No. 96 in D Major (The Miracle)
 I. Adagio; Allegro
 II. Andante
 III. Menuetto: Allegretto
 IV. Finale: Vivace assai

Track listing adapted from AllMusic.

Credits and personnel

 Blanton Alspaugh – Recording Producer
 Joost De Boo – Design
 Mark Donahue – Mastering, Mixing
 Simon M. Eder – Marketing, Merchandising, Production Director
 Franz Joseph Haydn – Composer
 Nancy Horowitz – Cover Image
 Carlos Kalmar – Conductor, Primary Artist
 Renaud Loranger – A&R
 Job Maarse – A&R, Executive Producer
 Leah Nash – Photography
 Veronica Neo – Merchandising
 John Newton – Engineer
 Oregon Symphony – Orchestra, Primary Artist
 Silvia Pietrosanti – Marketing
 Kate Rockett – A&R
 Elizabeth Schwartz – Liner Notes
 Max Tiel – Product Manager
 Dirk Jan Vink – Managing Director

Credits adapted from AllMusic.

See also

 2017 in classical music
 List of symphonies by Joseph Haydn

References

External links
 

2017 albums
Albums recorded at the Arlene Schnitzer Concert Hall
Oregon Symphony albums
PentaTone Classics albums